There are the following official tourism regions in Slovakia:

Division until 2004 
The districts (okresy) completely or partly included in the regions are indicated in brackets:

Bratislava and surroundings (Bratislava, Malacky, Pezinok, Senec)
Záhorie (Malacky, Myjava, Senica, Skalica)
Podunajsko [ Danube River region] (Dunajská Streda, Galanta, Komárno, Nové Zámky, Šaľa)
Považie [ Váh region] (Hlohovec, Nové Mesto n/Váhom, Piešťany, Trenčín, Trnava)
Horné Považie Upper Váh region (Bytča, Ilava, Považská Bystrica, Púchov, Žilina)
Ponitrie [ Nitra River region] (Bánovce nad Bebravou, Nitra, Partizánske, Prievidza, Šaľa, Topoľčany, Zlaté Moravce)
Kysuce (Čadca, Kysucké Nové Mesto)
Orava (Dolný Kubín, Námestovo, Tvrdošín)
Turiec (Martin, Turčianske Teplice)
Horehronie [ Upper Hron River region] (Banská Bystrica, Brezno)
Pohronie [ Hron River region] (Banská Štiavnica, Levice, Zlaté Moravce, Žarnovica, Žiar n/Hronom)
Podpoľanie [ Territory below the Poľana Mountains] (Detva, Krupina, Zvolen)
Novohrad (Levice, Lučenec, Poltár, Veľký Krtíš)
 (Revúca, Rimavská Sobota, Rožňava)
Liptov (Liptovský Mikuláš, Ružomberok)
Tatras (Kežmarok, Poprad)
Spiš (Gelnica, Levoča, Spišská Nová Ves)
Zamagurie [ Territory behind the Spišská Magura Mountains] (Stará Ľubovňa)
Šariš (Bardejov, Prešov, Sabinov, Stropkov, Svidník)
Košice and surroundings (Košice, Košice-okolie)
Horný Zemplín [ Upper Zemplin] (Humenné, Medzilaborce, Snina, Vranov n/Topľou)
Dolný Zemplín [ Lower Zemplin] (Michalovce, Sobrance, Trebišov)

Division from 2004 

Bratislava
Záhorie
Podunajsko
Dolné Považie [ Lower Váh region]
Stredné Považie [ Middle Váh region ]
Severné Považie [ Northern Váh region ]
Nitriansko [ Nitra region ]
Horná Nitra [ Upper region ]
Orava
Turiec
Horehronie
Pohronie
Tekov (Dolné Pohronie) [ Lower Hron region ]
Hont
Zvolensko-Podpoľanie
Novohrad (Poiplie) [ Ipeľ region ]

Liptov
Zamagurie
Tatras	
Spiš
Košice
Šariš	
Horný Zemplín
Dolný Zemplín

See also
Regions of Slovakia
List of traditional regions of Slovakia

References

Tourism in Slovakia
Tourism regions
Slovakia